The WRc Group is a company providing research and consultancy in water, waste and the environment in the United Kingdom. A government body set up in 1927 was merged in the 1970s with the Water Research Association and the Water Resources Board to form the Water Research Centre, which was controlled by the regional water authorities; the organisation was privatised in 1989 as WRc plc, then acquired by RSK Group in 2020.

History
The organisation was created in 1927 by the Department of Scientific and Industrial Research (DSIR) as the Water Pollution Research Board (WPRB). The Board had no laboratories and fulfilled its remit of providing research and advice on sewage treatment by outsourcing and conducting surveys. Laboratory facilities finally became available in 1940 when DSIR set up the Water Pollution Research Laboratory (WPRL) in Watford. During the Second World War WPRL also worked in other areas, notably the creation of a device for airmen to make sea water acceptable as drinking water.

In 1955 the WPRL moved to a purpose-built laboratory in Stevenage, and here it is associated with the first systematic analyses of sewage treatment. Following the 1974 reorganisation of the UK water supply industry both WPRL and the Water Resources Board (WRB) were hived off from the Civil Service and merged with the Water Research Association (WRA) to form a quango, controlled by the publicly-owned regional water authorities. The WRA had been founded in 1953 and provided research and advice on drinking water treatment to the municipal bodies responsible for drinking water supply; it was based at Medmenham, Buckinghamshire. The new organisation was renamed the Water Research Centre (WRC).

In 1989 the Water Research Centre was privatised and renamed WRc plc, as part of the privatisation of the UK water industry.  As part of the process a small offshoot, the Foundation for Water Research (FWR), was created and the Stevenage site was shut down. In 2004 the Medmenham site was also closed, leaving Swindon as WRc's main site. The WRc Group employs around 150 staff.  Until 2020, its shares were mainly owned by its staff and UK water companies; it was then acquired by the RSK Group.

Achievements
Notable WRc achievements include:

1960s
 First analysis that activated sludge nitrification could be mathematically modelled
1970s
 Development of first accurate general activated sludge model
 Development of the standard approach to minimising the effects of bulking sludge on activated sludge
 Only public body of extensive research of trickling filters
 Development of the SSVI technique for analysing activated sludge settleability
 Development of the first mass-flux based analysis of activated sludge settler design
 Development of two standard assessment techniques for sludge thickening and dewatering, the CST (capillary suction time) and PFT (pressure filtration test)
1980s 
 Water-industry standard techniques for assessing sludge rheology, and a general correlation for rheological properties used in the absence of experimental data
 Development of techniques for water mains and sewer rehabilitation, without requiring extensive digging and replacing of pipes
 Co-development with the UK water industry of the Urban Pollution Management procedure, the first formal procedure for analysing water pollution at the catchment level, and which was one of the drivers for the subsequent EU legislation behind the Water Framework Directive
 Comprehensive capital cost models (TR 61) used widely by the water companies, and recognised by Ofwat as a comparator for company-specific costs

Today
Today WRc works with a range of customers in the public and private sectors around the world. Its clients include:
 UK government and regulators such as: the Environment Agency, Department for Environment, Food & Rural Affairs (Defra), Communities and Local Government, Department for Transport (DfT), Highways Agency and the Office of Water Services (Ofwat).
 All of the UK water utilities, many international utilities and companies throughout the water and environmental supply chains.
 Waste management and recycling companies and organisations in their supply chains.
 European Commission Directorates General including: Environment, Research, Competition, Agriculture and Regional Policies.
 International funders such as the World Bank and the Department for International Development (DfID).
 Trade associations and not-for-profit organisations e.g. Waste and Resources Action Programme (WRAP), Water UK, Environmental Services Association (ESA) and UK Water Industry Research (UKWIR).
 Local governments and authorities.
 Blue chip companies involved in agriculture, retail and manufacturing (especially in the food and drink, chemical and pharmaceutical sectors).

References

External links 
 

Employee-owned companies of the United Kingdom
Privately held companies of the United Kingdom
Research institutes in Wiltshire
Water companies of the United Kingdom
Organisations based in Swindon